A Stitch in Time may refer to:
 A Stitch in Time (EP), a 2006 EP by The Twilight Singers
 "A Stitch in Time", a Mike Waterson song
 "A Stitch in Time", a song by The Smashing Pumpkins on their 2009 album Teargarden by Kaleidyscope
 A Stitch in Time (Lively novel), a 1976 novel by Penelope Lively
 A Stitch in Time (Robinson novel), a 2000 Star Trek: Deep Space Nine novel by Andrew J. Robinson
 A Stitch in Time, a 1919 American comedy silent film directed by Ralph Ince
 A Stitch in Time (film), a 1963 British comedy film with Norman Wisdom
 "A Stitch in Time" (The Outer Limits), a 1996 episode of The Outer Limits
 "A Stitch in Time" (Continuum), the 2012 premiere episode of the Canadian television series, Continuum

See also
 A Sitch in Time, 2003, the first feature-length animated Kim Possible movie
 The switch in time that saved nine, a metaphorical aphorism used to describe a purported change in the direction of the Supreme Court of the United States